Baxenden is a village and ward in the Borough of Hyndburn in Lancashire, North-West England. The ward population taken at the 2011 census was 4,042.  Baxenden is sometimes known to locals as Bash.

History 
Whilst people have inhabited the site for centuries, most of the village dates from the Victorian-Edwardian periods or is more recent.

Historically a part of the Blackburn Hundred the first record of Baxenden appears in 1194 as the site of a vaccary subject to Kirkstall Abbey. In the records Baxenden appears under the name Bastanedenecloch likely meaning valley where baking stones are found from the Old English bæc-stan meaning baking stone denu meaning valley (see dale) and clōh meaning ravine (in Northern Middle English clōh evolved into cloghe which has survived in a number of local place names as clough). By 1305 in the records of the de Lacy family the name of Baxenden had evolved to Bakestonden where records show 12s 2d were spent transporting seven loads of lead from Baxenden to Bradford. The lead mine closing as late as 1780. By 1494 the name had evolved to Baxtonden.

Local families of historic significance are the Cunliffes of Hollins, Holdens, Hargreaves & Kenyons.

Historically farming was the main occupation of the residents of Baxenden. Development of the area began during the Industrial Revolution. The current road through the area was the last road built by Blind Jack Metcalf o' Knaresborough and was completed in 1791 with the old road becoming what is now known as Back Lane and Hollins Lane. It was one of the most challenging roads that he built and he made a loss of £40 on a contract worth £3,500. Alongside this road print works, mills and coal mines developed which led to the need for greater housing in the area and the associated services needed.

The surnames Baxendale and Baxenden originate from this village.

Governance 

The village is part of the constituency of Hyndburn and is represented in Parliament by the Conservative MP Sara Britcliffe. It is represented in Hyndburn borough council by two Conservative councillors. Hyndburn borough council devolves some limited powers and funding to the Baxenden Area Council for resolving minor local issues.

Geography 

Baxenden lies south of Accrington on the A680 otherwise known as Manchester Road. It is between 200m at its northern edge and 280m at its southern edge above sea level. It is sited in a wedge shaped valley between Hameldon Hill and Oswaldtwistle Moor. Hameldon means scarred hill. Oswaldtwistle Moor is a part of the West Pennine Moors.  The valley presumably being carved out by the streams which flow through the area. These streams, Warmden Brook and Woodnook Water, merge beneath Accrington and are tributaries of the River Hyndburn; itself a tributary of the Rivers Calder and then Ribble.

Notable facts

Baxenden ward is site of Haworth Park home to the Haworth Art Gallery. Built in 1909 as Hollins Hill for the prominent local industrialist William Haworth. After the death of his sister Miss Anne Haworth in 1920 she bequeathed it to the town and, in honour, the town named the Gallery for her family. Opened 21 September 1921 the Gallery is home of probably Europe's most significant collection of Tiffany glass chiefly consisting of over one hundred and forty pieces of his Favrile, or ‘hand-made', Glass. The gallery also has a collection of oil paintings and watercolours.

Baxenden is probably best known as the home of Holland's Pies.

Baxenden is also the home of the chemicals works Baxenden Chemicals.

On the night of 6 September 1974, the so-called Black Panther, Donald Neilson, shot the Baxenden sub-postmaster, Derek Astin, at his home, injuring him so that he died soon after arriving at hospital.

The Irish republican social campaigner Michael Davitt worked as a child at Stelfoxe's Victoria Mill (later the Victoria and Alliance Mill) in Baxenden. It was here, at the age of eleven, where his arm was lacerated so badly by a spinning machine it had to be amputated; for which he received no compensation.

Transport 

Baxenden was once served by Baxenden railway station however this was closed in 1951 before the lines themselves were removed in 1970-71 as recommended by the Beeching Axe. This line was once notorious as one of the most difficult in the country due to its ‘alpine' nature involving a climb from the junction at Stubbins railway station for 5 miles at an average of 1 in 78 to a summit in Baxenden at 771 feet above sea level followed by a 2 and a quarter mile drop down Baxenden Bank, at times as steep as 1 in 38/40. Nowadays ‘the lines' as they are known is a well used footpath which has been recently incorporated into a network of paths that lead throughout the borough.

Buses to Rochdale, Blackburn, Accrington and Manchester pass through Baxenden.

Education 

Baxenden has one primary school; St John's Primary built in 1880 to replace a school built in the 1833 sited near the modern junction of Manchester Road with Southwood Drive, and one high school; The Hollins.

Religious sites 

There were two churches in Baxenden. St John the Baptist Church founded in 1875, site of the war memorial, and  Baxenden  Methodist Church, which closed in 2013. The modern vicarage, built in 1977, stands on the site of the old Baxenden House and the Baxenden vaccary of Henry de Lacy, Baron of Pontefract.

Sports 

Baxenden Cricket Club, founded around 1868, play in the local cricket league from their grounds off Back Lane. There is a yearly race in the area called the Bash Grueller.
Baxenden Golf Club, founded in 1913 a challenging 9 hole course.

Baxenden Allotments and Gardens Society 

B.A.G.S. as it is known locally, has been in existence for over 50 years and was set up by and for local gardeners.
BAGS holds an Annual Flower Show at Hollins Technology College (next door) on the first Saturday of September, which is open to the public as well as members of the Society. The show consist of Flower, Vegetables, Confectionery, Floral Art, handicrafts and children's classes, with many sections open to none members and is a great community event for all the family.
For allotment information, advice and to learn more about the annual show visit the B.A.G.S. Website

Public services 

Baxenden has the usual amenities of a village of its size such as a dentist, takeaway, newsagents, butchers, bakers, pharmacy, hairdressers, numerous pubs - Dog & Partridge, Alma, Victoria, Village Club, etc.

As of 2013 Baxenden has had its own internet local radio station called Baxenden Radio.

See also 
 Listed buildings in Accrington

References

External links

Villages in Lancashire
Geography of Hyndburn